USS Graylag (AM-364) was an Admirable-class minesweeper built for the U.S. Navy during World War II. She was built to clear minefields in offshore waters.

Graylag, a steel-hulled fleet minesweeper, was launched by Willamette Iron and Steel Works, Astoria, Oregon, 4 December 1943; and commissioned 31 August 1945.

End-of-war activity 
After steaming to San Diego, California, 11 October, Graylag got underway 1 November for Pearl Harbor, where she arrived eight days later. The ship picked up passengers and returned to San Diego 29 December.

Graylag then steamed by way of the Panama Canal to New Orleans, Louisiana, 7 December to 26 December 1945, and arrived 27 March 1946 at Orange, Texas, after overhaul.

Post-war decommissioning 
She decommissioned 12 August 1946, was placed in reserve, and remained there through 1967. Graylags designation was changed to MSF-364 on 7 February 1955. Graylag was stricken from the Navy List 1 October 1967 and sold for scrap.

References

External links 
 NavSource Online: Mine Warfare Vessel Photo Archive - Graylag (MSF 364) - ex-AM-364

Admirable-class minesweepers
World War II mine warfare vessels of the United States
Ships built in Astoria, Oregon
1943 ships